LeRoy Franklin Mason (July 2, 1903 – October 13, 1947) was an American film actor who worked primarily in Westerns in both the silent and sound film eras. Mason was born in Larimore, North Dakota on July 2, 1903.

Career

1920s
Mason's first film was Hit and Run opposite Hoot Gibson (1924). He was officially credited in Born to Battle (1926) opposite Tom Tyler and Jean Arthur. In 1926, Mason starred in The Arizona Streak opposite Tom Tyler, Frankie Darro, and Ada Mae Vaughn. Also in 1926, he starred in Lightning Hutch opposite Charles Hutchison and Edith Thornton. Mason starred opposite Tom Tyler, Doris Hill, and Frankie Darro in Tom and His Pals (1926). He starred opposite William Fairbanks, Alice Calhoun, and Frank Rice in Flying High (1926). He starred in Closed Gates (1928) opposite John Harron, Jane Novak, and Lucy Beaumont. Mason starred in Golden Shackles (1928) opposite Grant Withers and Priscilla Bonner. He starred in The Avenging Shadow (1928) opposite Margaret Morris. Mason starred in The Law's Lash (1928) opposite Robert Ellis and Mary Mayberry. He starred in Hit of the Show (1928), originally a silent film, opposite Joe E. Brown, Gertrude Olmstead, and William Bailey. Mason starred in Revenge (1928) Dolores del Río, James A. Marcus, and Rita Carewe. He starred in The Viking (1928) opposite Pauline Starke and Donald Crisp. Mason starred in Bride of the Desert (1929) opposite Alice Calhoun and Ethan Laidlaw. He starred in The Woman Who Was Forgotten (1930) opposite Belle Bennett and Jack Mower.

1930s
Mason starred opposite of Lon Chaney Jr. in The Last Frontier (1932). He starred opposite Ray "Crash" Corrigan in The Painted Stallion (1937). Mason starred opposite John Wayne in Wyoming Outlaw (1939) and New Frontier (1939).

1940s
Mason starred opposite David Sharpe in Silver Stallion (1941). He starred opposite Wild Bill Elliott in Hidden Valley Outlaws (1944). In the film, Mason and John James sings the song Oh Susanna.

Personal life and death
Mason  married Rita Carewe in 1928 and divorced her in 1936. He was married to actress Bo Ling; they had no children and eventually separated. A shooting accident while he worked on a film in the late 1930s caused him to lose sight in his right eye.

On October 13, 1947, Mason died of "acute myocardial infarction due to coronary thrombosis" in the Birmingham Veterans Administration Hospital in Van Nuys, California. He had been there for 31 days after suffering a heart attack on the set of California Firebrand. An Associated Press news story published October 14, 1947, says that Mason "collapsed on a Republic Studio set Monday and died a few hours later of a heart ailment."

Filmography

Film

The following were with John Wayne:
 Maker of Men (1931)
 California Straight Ahead! (1937)
 Santa Fe Stampede (1938)
 Wyoming Outlaw (1939)
 New Frontier (1939)

Other films:

 It Happened Out West (1937)
 Jungle Menace (1937)
 Heroes of the Hills (1938)
 Topa Topa (1938)
 The Painted Trail (1938)
 The Range Busters (1940)
 Rocky Mountain Rangers (1940)
 Triple Justice (1940)
 Across the Sierras (1941)
 Silver Stallion (1941)
 Chetniks! The Fighting Guerrillas (1943)
 Raiders of Sunset Pass (1943)
 Lucky Cowboy (1944)
 The Tiger Woman (1944)
 San Fernando Valley (1944)

References

Citations

Sources

External links

1903 births
1947 deaths
People from Grand Forks County, North Dakota
Male actors from North Dakota
American male film actors
American male silent film actors
Male film serial actors
Male Western (genre) film actors
Burials at Forest Lawn Memorial Park (Glendale)
20th-century American male actors